The 2015 season for  began in January at the Vuelta al Táchira. Androni Giocattoli–Venezuela is an Italian-registered UCI Professional Continental cycling team that participated in road bicycle racing events on the UCI Continental Circuits and when selected as a wildcard to UCI ProTour events.

Team roster

Riders who joined the team for the 2015 season

Riders who left the team during or after the 2014 season

Season victories

Victory originally obtained by Appollonio but vacated

National, Continental and World champions 2015

References

External links
 

2015 road cycling season by team
Drone Hopper–Androni Giocattoli